Richard Scott Smith (January 24, 1912 – April 5, 1980) was an American football offensive lineman in the National Football League for the Boston Redskins, Chicago Bears, and the Philadelphia Eagles.  He played college football at Ohio State University.

1912 births
Sportspeople from East Chicago, Indiana
Players of American football from Indiana
American football offensive linemen
Boston Redskins players
Chicago Bears players
Philadelphia Eagles players
1980 deaths